Bill Spokes (13 November 1913 – 31 October 1985) was  a former Australian rules footballer who played with Fitzroy in the Victorian Football League (VFL).

Notes

External links 
		

1913 births
1985 deaths
Australian rules footballers from Victoria (Australia)
Fitzroy Football Club players